Handunnetti Rannulu Piyasiri (known as H. R. Piyasiri) was a Member of Parliament and a member of the Southern Province Council. He is also the current Sri Lankan Ambassador in Myanmar.

He was the State Minister of Labor and Vocational Training and was also one time Chairman of Lotteries Board.

He was educated at Nalanda College Colombo. While at school he played for First XI cricket team in 1960 that was captained by Gamini Jayawickrama Perera.

See also
List of Sri Lankan non-career diplomats

References

MID-WEEK POLITICS by Prasad Gunewardene

 31st Battle of the Maroons Nalanda Team

Alumni of Nalanda College, Colombo
Ambassadors of Sri Lanka to Myanmar
Members of the 9th Parliament of Sri Lanka
Sri Lankan Buddhists
Sinhalese civil servants
Sri Lankan diplomats
Sinhalese politicians
United National Party politicians